HH may refer to:

Organizations
 Happy Hippie Foundation, a non-profit organization founded by Miley Cyrus
 Hartmann House Preparatory School, an independent preparatory school in Harare, Zimbabwe
 Heirs Holdings, a Nigerian conglomerate with diversified interests
 Helly Hansen, a Norwegian brand specializing in clothing and gear for oceans and mountains
 Heywood Hill, a bookshop in London

Science and technology
 Hh, a signalling molecule in Drosophila named for the Hedgehog signaling pathway
 hh blood group, a rare blood type
 Henderson–Hasselbalch equation, in biology and chemistry
 Herbig–Haro object, in astronomy
 Hitchhiker Program, a NASA program established in 1984
 Hodgkin–Huxley model, an electrical model of neurons
 Microsoft Compiled HTML Help (hh.exe)
 Hereditary haemochromatosis

Transportation
 HH (Court Street Shuttle) a defunct line on the New York City Subway from 1936 to 1946
 HH (Rockaway Shuttle), from 1962 to 1972
 HH Ferry route between Helsingborg, Sweden and Helsingør, Denmark
 Air Hamburg, a German airline based in Hamburg (IATA code HH)

Other uses
hh (digraph), in several languages
 HH, a brassiere cup size
 hh, an abbreviation for "hands high" when referring to the height of a horse
 HH, short for Hand-Held, a term in film production among camera staff
HH, the production code for the 1967 Doctor Who serial The Moonbase
 Habbo, online community formerly known as Habbo Hotel
 Hakainde Hichilema, Zambian politician
 Hamburg, Germany (ISO 3166-2 code DE-HH) and HH ("Hansestadt Hamburg"), vehicle licence plate prefix
 Happy Hour, a period of time (not necessarily one hour) when bars and restaurants offer discounts on food and/or drinks
Heil Hitler, a chant prevalent in Nazi Germany and neo-Nazi groups
 His Highness, or Her Highness, a formal address
 His Holiness, or Her Holiness, a formal address
 Horrible Histories, media franchise
Hulk Hogan, American professional wrestler
Herbert Huncke, American Writer